Trifluoromethyldeschloroketamine (TFMDCK) is a designer drug from the arylcyclohexylamine family, which is presumed to have similar properties to ketamine, a dissociative anesthetic drug with hallucinogenic and sedative effects. It has been sold over the internet since around 2016, though genuine samples appear to be rare. The o-trifluoromethyl analogue of hydroxynorketamine has also been researched as an antidepressant.

See also
 Bromoketamine
 Deschloroketamine
 Methoxyketamine
 Methoxmetamine

References

Arylcyclohexylamines
Designer drugs
Dissociative drugs
Trifluoromethyl compounds